The 2021 Tipperary Senior Hurling Championship was the 131st staging of the Tipperary Senior Hurling Championship since its establishment by the Tipperary County Board in 1887. The championship began on 27 August 2021 and is scheduled to end on 28 November 2021.

Kiladangan entered the championship as the defending champions, however, they were beaten by Thurles Sarsfields at the semi-final stage.

The championship was won for the fourth time by Loughmore–Castleiney after a replay in the final against Thurles Sarsfields.

Team changes

To Championship

Promoted from the Séamus Ó Riain Cup
 Mullinahone

From Championship

Relegated to the Séamus Ó Riain Cup
 Burgess

Group stage

Group 1

Results

Group 2

Results

Group 3

Results

Group 4

Results

Relegation

Semi-finals

Final

Knockout stage

Bracket

Preliminary quarter-final

Quarter-finals

Semi-finals

Final

Championship statistics

Top scorers

Overall

In a single game

Championship statistics

Miscellaneous
 Loughmore–Castleiney won their first title since 2013.
 Loughmore–Castleiney won the double for the second time in their history.

References

External links
 Matchday programme from the final

Tipperary
Tipperary Senior Hurling Championship
Tipperary Senior Hurling Championship